A Self-Made Hero is a 1996 French film directed by Jacques Audiard. It is based on the novel by Jean-François Deniau.

Synopsis
Albert Dehousse has grown up on heroic novels, unfortunately his life isn't quite so exciting. Albert lives in a village in Northern France with his mother, who lives in memory of her husband, who she claims died a hero in the First World War. World War Two passes the pair by, as Albert is not called up as he is the only child of a war widow, denying him of his chance to become a hero. Having married the daughter of a member of the resistance, he leaves his family and his marriage for Paris where heroes are truly celebrated.

About the film
"Les vies les plus belles sont celles qu'on s'invente", (the most beautiful lives are those we invent) announces an older Albert Dehousse at the beginning of the film. Un héros très discret is a film which investigates the divide between fantasy and reality.

Cast

 Mathieu Kassovitz : Albert Dehousse
 Albert Dupontel : Dionnet
 Anouk Grinberg : Servane
 Sandrine Kiberlain : Yvette
 Nadia Barentin : General's wife
 Bernard Bloch : Ernst
 François Chattot : Louvier
 Philippe Duclos : Caron
 Danièle Lebrun : Madame Dehousse
 Clotilde Mollet : Odette
 François Berléand : Monsieur Jo
 Philippe Nahon : The General
 Jean-Louis Trintignant : Albert Dehousse (old)
 Bruno Putzulu : Meyer
 François Levantal : Delavelle
 Armand de Baudry d'Asson : Englishman
 Wilfred Benaïche : Nervoix

Awards and nominations
Cannes Film Festival (France)
Won: Best Screenplay (Jacques Audiard and Alain Le Henry)
Nominated: Golden Palm (Jacques Audiard)
César Awards (France)
Nominated: Best Actor – Supporting Role (Albert Dupontel)
Nominated: Best Actress – Supporting Role (Sandrine Kiberlain)
Nominated: Best Director (Jacques Audiard)
Nominated: Best Editing (Juliette Welfling)
Nominated: Best Music (Alexandre Desplat)
Nominated: Best Writing (Jacques Audiard and Alain Le Henry)
Stockholm Film Festival (Sweden)
Won: Best Screenplay (Jacques Audiard and Alain Le Henry)
Nominated: Bronze Horse
Valladolid Film Festival (Spain)
Won: Silver Spike (Jacques Audiard)
Nominated: Golden Spike (Jacques Audiard)

See also
 Confessions of a Dangerous Mind

References

External links
 
 A Self-Made Hero at Alice Cinéma (French)

1996 films
French comedy-drama films
1990s French-language films
Films directed by Jacques Audiard
Films with screenplays by Jacques Audiard